The Kenton County Public Library is a library system serving the residents of Kenton County, Kentucky. The library ranked first in Kentucky in Hennen's American Public Library Ratings 2008.

The Covington Public Library was established in 1898. A donation from Andrew Carnegie gave the city a two-story Carnegie library, completed in 1904.

References

External links

 Kenton County Public Library

Buildings and structures in Kenton County, Kentucky
Public libraries in Kentucky
Education in Kenton County, Kentucky